Sir Frederick Peel  (26 October 1823 – 6 June 1906), was a British Liberal Party politician and railway commissioner.

Background and education
Peel was second son of Prime Minister Sir Robert Peel, 2nd Baronet, by his wife Julia Floyd, daughter of General Sir John Floyd, 1st Baronet. He was the brother of Sir Robert Peel, 3rd Baronet, Sir William Peel and Arthur Peel, 1st Viscount Peel. He was educated at Harrow and Trinity College, Cambridge, becoming a barrister in 1849.  At Cambridge he was a member of the Pitt Club.

Political career
Peel entered parliament in that year, when he was elected at an unopposed by-election in February 1849 as a Member of Parliament (MP) for Leominster. At the next general election, in 1852, he was returned as the MP for Bury, but was defeated in 1857. He regained the Bury seat in 1859, and remained in the House of Commons until a further defeat in 1865. He served as Under-Secretary of State for War and the Colonies under Lord John Russell from 1851 to 1852 and under Lord Aberdeen from 1852 to 1854, as Under-Secretary of State for the Colonies under Aberdeen from 1854 to 1855 and as Under-Secretary of State for War under Lord Palmerston from 1855 to 1857, when he was sworn of the Privy Counsellor. He again held office under Palmerston and then Russell as Financial Secretary to the Treasury from 1860 to 1865.

Peel's chief service to the state was in connection with the Railway and Canal Commission. He was appointed a commissioner on the inception of this body in 1873, and was its president until its reconstruction in 1888, remaining a member of the commission until his death in 1906. He was appointed a Knight Commander of the Order of St Michael and St George in 1869.

Death
Peel died in June 1906, aged 82.

See also
Peel's Restaurant

References

External links 
 

1823 births
1906 deaths
People educated at Harrow School
Alumni of Trinity College, Cambridge
Liberal Party (UK) MPs for English constituencies
Conservative Party (UK) MPs for English constituencies
Members of the Privy Council of the United Kingdom
UK MPs 1847–1852
UK MPs 1852–1857
UK MPs 1859–1865
Children of prime ministers of the United Kingdom
Knights Commander of the Order of St Michael and St George
Younger sons of baronets
Frederick